Cosmo Francesco Ruppi (6 June 1932 – 29 May 2011) was the Roman Catholic archbishop of the Roman Catholic Archdiocese of Lecce, Italy.

Ordained in 1954, Ruppi was named a bishop and was appointed to the Lecce Archdiocese in 1988. Archbishop Ruppi retired in 2009.

Notes

Roman Catholic archbishops in Italy
Bishops in Apulia
1932 births
2011 deaths